Hebeulima columnaria is a species of sea snail, a marine gastropod mollusk in the family Eulimidae.

References

  May, W. L. (1915). Additions to the Tasmanian marine Mollusca, with descriptions of new species. Papers and Proceedings of the Royal Society of Tasmania. (1915): 75-99

External links
 

Eulimidae
Gastropods described in 1916